Mirna Kvajo is a Croatian scientist and the chief editor of academic journal BMC Biology.

Education 
Kvajo has a bachelor's degree from the University of Zagreb and a PhD from the Friedrich Miescher Institute for Biomedical Research and the University of Basel.

Career 
After graduating, Kvajo undertook postdoctoral research work at the Columbia University Irving Medical Center.

She is currently the chief editor of academic journal BMC Biology. She previously worked as an editor at Cell Press editing the journal Cell Reports. In 2019, she initiated a policy change at BMC Biology whereby the journal started sharing peer reviews of rejected articles with other academic journal editors.

Selected publications 

 Kvajo, Mirna, et al. A mutation in mouse Disc1 that models a schizophrenia risk allele leads to specific alterations in neuronal architecture and cognition, Proceedings of the National Academy of Sciences 105.19 (2008): 7076–7081.
 Koike H, Arguello PA, Kvajo M, Karayiorgou M, Gogos JA. Disc1 is mutated in the 129S6/SvEv strain and modulates working memory in mice. Proceedings of the National Academy of Sciences. 2006 Mar 7;103(10):3693-7.

References 

Academic journal editors
University of Zagreb alumni
University of Basel alumni
Croatian women scientists
Living people
Year of birth missing (living people)